Edward Fredrick Fisher (October 31, 1876 – July 24, 1951) was a Major League Baseball pitcher who appeared in one game for the Detroit Tigers near the end of the 1902 season.  The 6'2" (188 cm), 200 pound (91 kg) right-hander was a native of Wayne, Michigan.
  
On September 5, 1902, Fisher pitched effectively in the last four innings of a 15–1 home loss against the Baltimore Orioles.  He allowed five runs, but none of them were earned runs, so his lifetime ERA stands at 0.00.

One of his teammates was second baseman Kid Gleason, who would go on to become the manager of the infamous 1919 Chicago White Sox (Black Sox).

Fisher died at the age of 74 in Spokane, Washington.

External links
Baseball Reference
Retrosheet

References

Major League Baseball pitchers
Baseball players from Michigan
Detroit Tigers players
1876 births
1951 deaths
Muskegon Reds players
Evansville River Rats players